Henry Edwin Arthur Holdsworth (26 January 1917 – 23 September 1984) was an Australian rules footballer who was highly successful in the West Australian National Football League (WANFL) playing for the Swan Districts Football Club.

A fine full forward who was a strong overhead mark and a very accurate kick Holdsworth topped the top goal kicker list at Swan Districts during his career. In 1937 and 1938 he kicked 109 and 116 goals respectively yet never topped the WANFL goal kickers list.

Undoubtedly Holdsworth would have kicked even more goals if he had been part of a more successful team and had not been called to play in defence to prevent other sides from kicking higher totals against the struggling Swans.

Holdsworth played twice for Western Australia, once at full forward and in the 1946 side that played South Australia Holdsworth played at fullback as he was also regarded as a fine backman.

Retiring as a player in 1947, Holdsworth had played 143 games for the club and booted 532 goals the second-most of any Swans player after Eric Gorman.
He went on to coach Swan Districts in 1952 and later became vice president of the club. He is named in the Swan Districts Team of the Century at full forward.

References

External links
Ted Holdsworth player profile page at WAFL FootyFacts

1917 births
1984 deaths
Australian rules footballers from Western Australia
Kalgoorlie City Football Club players
Swan Districts Football Club administrators
Swan Districts Football Club coaches
Swan Districts Football Club players